The Las Juntas Formation or Las Juntas Sandstone (Kiaj, Kialj, K1j) is a geological formation of the Altiplano Cundiboyacense and Tenza Valley, Eastern Ranges of the Colombian Andes. The Las Juntas Formation is found in the departments Cundinamarca, Boyacá and Casanare.

Etymology 
The formation was defined and named in 1979 by Rodríguez and Ulloa after Cerro Las Juntas, Guateque, Tenza Valley, Boyacá.

Description

Lithologies 

Stratigraphy and depositional environment 
The Las Juntas Formation, the uppermost unit of the Cáqueza Group, overlies the Macanal Formation and is overlain by the Fómeque Formation and the Apón Formation in the Sierra Nevada del Cocuy. The formation is subdivided into three members, from old to younger; Arenisca de El Volador, Lutitas Intermedias and Arenisca de Almeida. The age has been estimated to be Hauterivian. The formation has been deposited in a near shore deltaic environment, with as provenance areas the Santander High and the Guiana Shield. The formation represents a regressive sequence in the present-day Eastern Ranges, as the Rosablanca Formation in the Middle Magdalena Valley.

Outcrops 

The Las Juntas Formation is apart from its type locality east of Guateque, found in Chingaza National Park, in the El Cochal Synclinal east of the Ocetá Páramo, between Lake Tota and Labranzagrande, other parts of the Tenza Valley such as close to Macanal and Almeida.

The Támara Fault thrusts the Las Juntas Formation southeastward on top of the Tertiary San Fernando and Diablo Formations, and the Chámeza Fault thrusts the older Macanal Formation on top of the Las Juntas Formation around Chámeza, Casanare.

Regional correlations

See also 

 Geology of the Eastern Hills
 Geology of the Ocetá Páramo
 Geology of the Altiplano Cundiboyacense

Notes

References

Bibliography

Maps

External links 
 

Geologic formations of Colombia
Cretaceous Colombia
Lower Cretaceous Series of South America
Hauterivian Stage
Sandstone formations
Deltaic deposits
Formations
Formations
Geography of Cundinamarca Department
Geography of Boyacá Department
Geography of Casanare Department